Jack Ü was an American DJ duo consisting of electronic music producers Skrillex and Diplo, formed in 2013. They released their first official single, "Take Ü There", featuring vocals from Kiesza, on September 17, 2014. On February 3, 2015, the duo announced that they would be working with Missy Elliott on a remix of "Take Ü There". They released their first and only album, Skrillex and Diplo Present Jack Ü, on February 27, 2015.

Jack Ü performed at Ultra Music Festival Miami in 2014. They also performed at Ultra Music Festival in 2015 with the entire "Jack Ü crew", featuring live contributions from CL, Kai, Diddy, Kiesza and Justin Bieber.

According to Skrillex, the collaboration is called 'Jack Ü' because it refers to how the music "jacks you up" with its high energy beats and bassline. The Ü (U with umlaut) letter appears in titles of all of its singles and is usually stylized to look like a smiley.

History

On September 15, 2013, Jack Ü's debut performance took place at Mad Decent Block Party in San Diego with 3 original tracks: a dubstep-juke hybrid track known as "Shark Patrol", "Bounce it", and a very early version of their collaboration with AlunaGeorge that would later be released as "To Ü"

Diplo announced the project by releasing the Mad Decent Block Party lineup with Jack Ü playing at multiple stops on the tour. After some guessing by many of who Jack Ü was, Diplo finally came out to reveal that "Jack Ü ... means Skrillex and Diplo together".

The two have worked with each other on assorted projects over the past five years starting with Skrillex singing and playing guitar on a record for Major Lazer, one of Diplo's other projects. In 2011, Diplo also worked on a song with Skrillex titled "Amplifire" (though it was never completed or released) for Bangarang.

On March 30, 2014, Jack Ü was given an hour-long slot to play at the Ultra Music Festival. The set included a wide variety of genres featuring songs from Skrillex's then newly released first studio album, Recess, and including some old school hip hop with DJ Kool's "Let Me Clear My Throat". They later played the 2015 Ultra Music Festival.

They collaborated on a song that combines trap and dubstep elements and features vocals from Korean pop artists CL and G-Dragon titled "Dirty Vibe" for Skrillex's album Recess. When asked about how the two ended up forming Jack Ü, Diplo stated that Skrillex "was one of the first producers I met when I moved to LA...we just [have] always been really close musically with our ideas." The two get together in downtown LA or in hotel rooms when on tour to make their songs.

On December 31, 2014, Jack Ü headlined a concert at Madison Square Garden. Besides their (Diplo and Skrillex) performance, other performers included ASAP Ferg, Diplo, Skrillex, Rudimental and Yellow Claw. The concert was broadcast live on Yahoo.

On February 27, 2015, the group released their debut album. They commemorated the event by streaming a 24-hour live DJ set on Twitch, which was shut down 18 hours into the set.

Jack Ü had over 9.6 million Shazams in 2015.

Jack Ü performed at a 2015 Clippers half-time show along with Kai, Fly Boi Keno (also known as Keno Kamino) and several other celebrities and dancers, later releasing an official video in December.

On August 28, 2016, Skrillex wrote on his Twitter page that Jack Ü is done touring "for a long long time", a tweet that was shortly deleted. In March 2017, Diplo described in an interview the difficulty of working with Skrillex while Skrillex is signed to a "major label", Atlantic Records.

Controversy
On September 1, 2014, Seth Troxler, was set to play his set at the Robot Heart stage at the Burning Man Festival. However, due to some of his entourage not being allowed to join him behind the DJ decks, Troxler refused to play. Those in charge of the Robot Heart stage needed someone to fill in for Troxler and they asked Skrillex to help. Skrillex played for about half an hour before inviting Diplo to come onto the stage for them to perform as Jack Ü for the rest of the set.

Some of the Robot Heart crowd were unhappy, because Skrillex and Diplo are mainstream producers, and the Robot Heart stage is more about underground artists and songs. To finish up their set Diplo mixed the song "Africa" by Toto into DJ Snake and Lil Jon's platinum record "Turn Down for What" as "an inside joke".

Rumors later surfaced that the two were booed off the stage and forced to end their set early due to playing "Turn Down for What" at a stage that was meant for underground music. Diplo linked to a long statement on his Twitter, saying that "there was no booing... no bad vibes... Everything we did there was good fun and all the people that attended know it".

Releases
Jack Ü's hit debut single, "Take Ü There", was released on September 17, 2014. In an interview with Zane Lowe of BBC's Radio 1 station, Skrillex explained that the making of the song had a unique process; they were set to play a show in Ibiza, Spain when they saw Canadian pop singer Kiesza perform ahead of them. Impressed with her singing, they asked her to do the vocals for a song. They recorded her vocals in their hotel room and finished the song in one night.

During a set at Camp Question Mark of the Burning Man festival (one of eight different sets they played over the course of the festival), the duo played "Take Ü There" along with demo versions of "To Ü", of the electro and future bass genres, featuring vocals from AlunaGeorge. "Beat Knockin'" (Originally titled Beat Steady), which features vocals by New Orleans bounce artist Fly Boi Keno, being some of the first mainstream DJ's to display New Orleans bounce music publicly. In late 2014, Jack Ü played a mix for BBC Radio 1xtra. They played numerous demo versions of tracks and an unreleased song in a two-hour takeover mix including "Febreze" featuring 2 Chainz, "Jungle Bae", "Cumbia Trap" featuring Maluca and "Holla Out" with Snails. "Febreze", "Jungle Bae" and "Holla Out" are all included on their debut record, with "Cumbia Trap" excluded from the album's release. Diplo has also discussed an upcoming Jack Ü mixtape, however no official release date has yet been announced. Skrillex has also mentioned that Jack Ü has "got five songs that we made that aren't even released, and we'll end up releasing in 2014".

On February 27, 2015, after attempting to livestream a 24-hour DJ set on Twitch, which was shut down by local authorities at the 18-hour mark, Skrillex and Diplo released their debut collaborative album entitled Skrillex and Diplo Present Jack Ü on iTunes. Alongside the previously announced six tracks, the album's release included unannounced songs "Where Are Ü Now" with Justin Bieber, "Mind" featuring Kai, "Don't Do Drugs Just Take Some Jack Ü" and a remixed version of "Take Ü There" featuring Missy Elliott.

Discography

Studio albums

Singles

Remixes

Other charted songs

Production credits

Awards and nominations

References

American DJs
American electronic musicians
American dance music groups
American musical duos
Diplo
Electronic dance music DJs
Electronic dance music duos
Electronic music supergroups
Grammy Award winners for dance and electronic music
Mad Decent artists
Owsla artists